Ti, koyto si na nebeto (English: Though, which art heaven) is a 1990 Bulgarian film  directed by Viktor Paskov and Docho Bodzhakov.
The film's lead actor Jozef Kroner was nominated for European Film Award for Best Actor.

Cast
Jozef Kroner as Geprg Henih
Boyan Kovachev as Viktor
Lyuben Chatalov as Viktor's father

Synopsis
А dying man reveals to his young friend, a child of 8, the fairy world of music.

Awards
European Film Award for Best Actor - Jozef Kroner (nominated)

References

External links

1990s Hungarian-language films
1990 films